Xuzhou Guanyin International Airport  is the airport serving Xuzhou, Jiangsu Province, People's Republic of China. As of 2016, it is the 62nd busiest civil airport in China.

History
Xuzhou airport was opened on November 8, 1997, consisting of a  terminal building and  runway. The construction cost was estimated at $105 million, with most of the cost provided by the Xuzhou municipal government.

Terminal 2
The inauguration of Terminal 2 was on June 8, 2018. With 34,000 square meters of space, the new terminal has 8 jet bridges, 20 check-in counters, 10 automated check-in machines, 10 security checkpoints and more than 1,312 seats. With this new facility, the airport can handle another 5 million passengers and 50,000 metric tons of cargo every year. It also adds a natural gas energy system, used to provide refrigeration, heating, and partial power.

Since the opening of Terminal 2, it has been exclusively used for domestic flights, while regional international flights use Terminal 1.

Airlines and destinations

See also
List of airports in China

References

Airports in Jiangsu
Airports established in 1997